"What's My Name?" is a song by American hip hop recording artist DMX, released as the first single released from his third album ...And Then There Was X (1999). The single peaked at #67 on the Billboard Hot 100 in the U.S. "What's My Name?" was produced by Self and co-produced by Irv Gotti. It went Gold on May 21, 2021 with all of his other Rap Songs.

Music video
The video for "What's My Name?" (directed by Little X) is somewhat similar to Lenny Kravitz's "Are You Gonna Go My Way". The music video features guest appearances from Jay-Z, Ja Rule, Ruff Ryders, Irv Gotti and Murder Inc.

Charts

Weekly charts

Year-end charts

Certifications

References

2000 singles
DMX (rapper) songs
Music videos directed by Director X
Def Jam Recordings singles
Ruff Ryders Entertainment singles
Hardcore hip hop songs
Gangsta rap songs
1999 songs
Songs written by DMX (rapper)